

Background 
Stand Up! for Democracy in D.C. Coalition, commonly referred to as simply Stand Up! or "Free DC!", is a grassroots, nonpartisan citizens advocacy group and 501(c)(3) nonprfit organization.  Founded in 1997, the aim of Stand Up! is to achieve total statehood for the District of Columbia, defined by the group as recognition of the District of Columbia's long-standing petition for statehood, complete control of the local budget, with no review or veto by Congress of the District's budget or local laws, its own locally elected or appointed judges, and full voting representation in the United States House and Senate.

See also 

 Anise Jenkins
 Woman's National Democratic Club
 D.C. Statehood Green Party
 District of Columbia voting rights
 District of Columbia statehood movement
 District of Columbia voting rights

References

External links 
 

Organizations based in Washington, D.C.